Genola is a comune (municipality) in the Province of Cuneo in the Italian region Piedmont, located about  south of Turin and about  northeast of Cuneo.

Genola borders the following municipalities: Fossano and Savigliano.

Demographic evolution

Twin towns — sister cities
Genola is twinned with:

  Marcos Juárez, Argentina

References

Cities and towns in Piedmont